Humpback Mountain (Cascades)
Humpback Mountain (North Carolina)

Humpback Mountain (Virginia)

Humpback Mountain (British Columbia)